Nasir Aziz (born 16 June 1986) is a Pakistani-born cricketer who played for the United Arab Emirates national cricket team. He is a right-handed batsman and Right-arm offbreak bowler. He was named in the 2014 ICC World Twenty20 squad for the United Arab Emirates national cricket team

Career
Nasir made his first class cricket against Canada on 1 August 2013. He also made his List A cricket against  Bermuda national cricket team. He made his One Day International debut for the United Arab Emirates against Afghanistan on 2 December 2014. He made his Twenty20 International debut against the Netherlands in the 2015 ICC World Twenty20 Qualifier tournament on 12 July 2015.

In the inaugural ACC Emerging Teams Cup held in 2013,he was the leading wicket taker with 17 scalps.

In the 2015 ICC Cricket World Cup held in Australia, in a clash against West Indies he along with Amjad Javed set the joint highest ever partnership for the 7th wicket in ICC Cricket World Cup history(107).In fact, both Javed and Aziz became the second pair of batsmen to put a 100 runstand for the 7th wicket in World Cup history.

References

External links 
 
 

1986 births
Living people
Emirati cricketers
United Arab Emirates One Day International cricketers
United Arab Emirates Twenty20 International cricketers
Cricketers at the 2015 Cricket World Cup
Pakistani emigrants to the United Arab Emirates
Pakistani expatriate sportspeople in the United Arab Emirates